Samantha Schenini Galvan (born 19 September 1998 in Bellinzona) is a model and actress of swiss-dominican origins.

She participated and won in several beauty and talent contests.

She is known as "Jasmine", the secretary and co-star of the international Tv Series Sport Crime.

References

1998 births
Living people
People from Bellinzona